Stephensoniella brevipedunculata is a species of liverwort in the family Exormothecaceae. It is the only species in the genus Stephensoniella. It is confined to the Western Himalaya in Himachal Pradesh and Uttaranchal. It is threatened by habitat loss.

The genus name of Stephensoniella is in honour of John Stephenson (1871–1933), who was a surgeon and zoologist.

References

External links
Sharma, A., Paul, Y., & Langer, A. (2011). Status of Stephensoniella brevipedunculata in Jammu (NW Himalayas)-India. Archive for Bryology, 107, 1–3.

Endangered plants
Marchantiales
Flora of West Himalaya
Taxonomy articles created by Polbot